This is the structure of the Royal Air Force, as of October 2020.

Air Command
Air Command was formed as a merger of Strike Command, and Personnel and Training Command to administer the majority of operational units within the RAF. It doesn't have an overall commander, but instead two deputy commanders– one for Operations and one for Capability. The Deputy Commander (Operations) has been Air Marshal Gerry Mayhew, since May 2019; and the Deputy Commander (Capability) has been Air Marshal Andrew Turner, also since May 2019.

Headquarters, RAF Air Command, at RAF High Wycombe, Buckinghamshire
RAF Safety Centre, at RAF High Wycombe

No. 1 Group
No. 1 Group is one of two operations groups within Air Command, controlling the RAF's fast combat aircraft and the associated airfields. The AOC has been Air Vice Marshal Ian Duguid, since he took up the appointment in November 2021.

Headquarters, No. 1 Group, at RAF High Wycombe, Buckinghamshire
RAF Coningsby
No. 3 Squadron RAF, (Eurofighter Typhoon)
No. 11 Squadron RAF, (Eurofighter Typhoon)
No. 12 Squadron RAF, (Eurofighter Typhoon)
No. 29 Squadron RAF, (Eurofighter Typhoon) (Operational Conversion Unit)
RAF Typhoon Display Team
Battle of Britain Memorial Flight, (Lancaster, Spitfire, Hurricane, Dakota, Chipmunk)
RAF Leeming
No. 100 Squadron RAF, (Hawk T1A)
No. 607 (County of Durham) Squadron RAuxAF
Joint Forward Air Controller Training and Standards Unit
RAF Lossiemouth
No. 1 Squadron RAF, (Eurofighter Typhoon)
No. 2 Squadron RAF, (Eurofighter Typhoon)
No. 6 Squadron RAF, (Eurofighter Typhoon)
No. 9 Squadron RAF, (Eurofighter Typhoon)
No. 602 (City of Glasgow) Squadron RAuxAF
RAF Marham
No. 207 Squadron RAF, (F-35B Lightning II) (Operational Conversion Unit)
No. 617 Squadron RAF, (F-35B Lightning II)
RAF Waddington
RAF Scampton
No. 1 Air Control Centre RAF, at RAF Scampton
Royal Air Force Aerobatic Team (Red Arrows) (Hawk T1A), at RAF Scampton
Intelligence, Surveillance, Target Acquisition, and Reconnaissance (ISTAR) Force, at RAF Waddington – formed part of the combined NATO Airborne Electronic Warfare Force
ISTAR Force Commander, Air Commodore Nick Hay
No. 8 Squadron RAF, (Sentry AEW1)
No. 13 Squadron RAF, (MQ-9 Reaper)
No. 14 Squadron RAF, (Shadow R1)
No. 39 Squadron RAF, (MQ-9 Reaper) (and Creech AFB)
No. 51 Squadron RAF, (RC-135W Airseeker)
No. 54 Squadron RAF, at RAF Waddington
Detachment, at RAF Lossiemouth (with Poseidon MRA1)

No. 120 Squadron RAF, (Poseidon MRA1), at RAF Lossiemouth
No. 616 (South Yorkshire) Squadron RAuxAF
Poseidon Line Squadron, at RAF Lossiemouth
Poseidon Tactical Operations Centre, at RAF Lossiemouth
No. 1 Intelligence Surveillance and Reconnaissance Wing RAF, at RAF Waddington
No. 1 Intelligence, Surveillance, and Reconnaissance Squadron RAF
No. 2 Intelligence, Surveillance, and Reconnaissance Squadron RAF
No. 3 Intelligence, Surveillance, and Reconnaissance Squadron RAF
No. 54 Signals Unit RAF
Intelligence, Surveillance, and Reconnaissance Support Squadron RAF

Air and Space Warfare Centre
Air and Space Warfare Centre, at RAF Waddington
Development Division
Operational Analysis Element
Integrated Mission Support
Operations Support Division
Flying Division
No. 17 Squadron RAF, at Edwards AFB (F-35B Lightning II OEU)
No. 41 Squadron RAF, at RAF Coningsby (Eurofighter Typhoon OEU)No. 206 Squadron RAF, at RAF Brize Norton
Rotary Wing Test and Evaluation Squadron, at MoD Boscombe Down
Empire Test Pilots' School, at MoD Boscombe Down
Operations Division
No. 92 Squadron RAF, at RAF Waddington
Command and Battlespace Management (Air) Working Group
Information Operations Group
Test and Evaluation Division
No. 56 Squadron RAF, at RAF Waddington (OEU for ISTAR)No. 216 Unmanned Aerial Systems Test and Evaluation Squadron, at RAF Waddington (OEU for UAVs)Joint Air Delivery Test and Evaluation Unit, at RAF Brize Norton

No. 2 Group
No. 2 Group is the other operations group within Air Command, providing aircraft that support the Royal Navy and RAF front line aircraft, the Royal Air Force Police, and the Royal Air Force Regiment. Its current air officer commanding is Air Vice-Marshal Suraya Marshall, and has been since October 2021.

Following the disbandment of No. 38 Group RAF on 31 December 2020, all units of the former group were moved under a new 1-star 'RAF Support Force', which now forms part of No. 2 Group.

Headquarters, No. 2 Group, at RAF High Wycombe, Buckinghamshire
No. 505 (Wessex) Squadron RAuxAF, at RAF St Mawgan
No. 10 Squadron RAF, (Airbus Voyager KC2/KC3)
No. 32 (The Royal) Squadron RAF, (BAE 146 CC2/CC3, AW109S Grand) (VIP Transport)No. 101 Squadron RAF, (Airbus Voyager KC2/KC3)
No. 606 (Chiltern) Squadron RAuxAF
No. 622 (Reserve Aircrew) Squadron RAuxAF
RAF(U) Swanwick
RAF Scampton
RAF Fylingdales
RAF Boulmer
RAF Benson
RAF Brize Norton
RAF Odiham
RAF Northolt
RAF Henlow
RAF Honington
RAF Wittering
RAF High Wycombe
Airborne Delivery Wing, at RAF Brize Norton
Headquarters and Operation Squadron
Parachute Training Squadron
Performance Development Squadron
RAF Falcons Parachute Display Team
Parachute Engineering Squadron
Support Squadron
Air Mobility Force Headquarters, at RAF Brize Norton
No. 24 Squadron RAF, (C-130 Hercules, A400M Atlas, C-17 Globemaster) (Air Mobility Operational Conversion Unit)No. 47 Squadron RAF, (C-130 Hercules)
No. 70 Squadron RAF, (A400M Atlas)
No. 99 Squadron RAF, (C-17 Globemaster)
RAF Support Force, at RAF High Wycombe
No. 7644 (VR) Public Relations Squadron RAuxAF, at RAF Halton
No. 4624 (County of Oxford) Squadron RAuxAF, at RAF Brize Norton
Operations Wing
No. 1 Air Mobility Wing, at RAF Brize Norton
Headquarters Squadron
Operational Support Squadron
Mobile Air Movements Squadron
No. 90 Signals Unit, at RAF Leeming
Headquarters Squadron
Tactical Communications Wing, at RAF Leeming
No. 1 (Engineering Support) Squadron
No. 2 (Field Communications) Squadron
No. 3 (Field Communications) Squadron
Operational Information Services Wing, at RAF Leeming
No. 4 (Capability and Innovation) Squadron
No. 5 (Information Services) Squadron
No. 591 Signals Unit
Support Wing
No. 501 (County of Gloucester) Squadron RAuxAF, at RAF Brize Norton
No. 504 (County of Nottingham) Squadron RAuxAF, at RAF Wittering
No. 605 (County of Warwick) Squadron RAuxAF, at RAF Cosford
No. 42 (Expeditionary Support) Wing, at RAF Wittering – providing engineering support
No. 71 (Inspection and Repair) Squadron, at RAF Wittering
No. 93 (Expeditionary Armaments) Squadron, at RAF Marham
No. 5001 Squadron RAF, at RAF Wittering
No. 5131 (Bomb Disposal) Squadron
Joint Aircraft Recovery and Transportation Squadron, at MoD Boscombe Down (joint RN and RAF)No. 85 (Expeditionary Logistics) Wing, at RAF Wittering
No. 1 Expeditionary Logistics Squadron, at RAF Wittering
No. 2 Mechanical Transport Squadron, at RAF Wittering
No. 3 Mobile Catering Squadron, at RAF Wittering
Royal Air Force Mountain Rescue Service, Headquarters at RAF Valley
RAF Medical Services
Head of Royal Air Force Medical Services, Air Commodore D. C. McLoughlin
No. 612 (County of Aberdeen) Medical Support Squadron RAuxAF, at Leuchars Station
No. 4626 (County of Wiltshire) Aeromedical Evacuation Squadron RAuxAF
Princess Mary's Royal Air Force Nursing Service
RAF Centre of Aviation Medicine, at RAF Henlow
Tactical Medical Wing, at RAF Brize Norton
Aeromedical Evacuation Squadron
Operations and Logistics Squadron
Capability and Sustainment Squadron
Training Squadron
Royal Air Force Music Services (Provide medical services in times of conflict)Headquarters Music Services, at RAF Northolt
Central Band of the Royal Air Force
Band of the Royal Air Force Regiment
Band of the Royal Air Force College, at RAF Cranwell
Band of the Royal Auxiliary Air Force, at RAF Cranwell
Intelligence Reserves Wing, at RAF Waddington
No. 7006 Intelligence Squadron RAuxAF
Detachment, at RAF Wyton
Detachment, at RAF Brize Norton
Detachment, at RAF High Wycombe
Detachment, at RAF Digby
No. 7010 Photographic Interpretation Squadron RAuxAF
Detachment, at RAF Wyton
No. 7630 Intelligence Squadron RAuxAF
RAF Force Protection Force Headquarters, at RAF Honington
RAF Barnham
RAF Force Protection Centre, at RAF Honington
RAF Regiment Training Wing, at RAF Honington
Royal Air Force Police, at RAF Honington
Counter Intelligence & Exploitation Squadron, at RAF Henlow
Defence Flying Complaints Investigation Team, at RAF Henlow
Digital Forensic Flight, at RAF Henlow
Professional Standards Department Headquarters, at RAF Henlow
Provost Marshal's Dog Unit, at RAF Henlow
Provost Marshal's Dog Inspectorate, at RAF Henlow
Service Complaints Investigation Team, at RAF Henlow
Specialist and Security Police Wing, at RAF Honington
No. 2 Force Protection Wing, at RAF Leeming
No. 34 Squadron RAF Regiment, at RAF Leeming
No. 609 (West Riding) Squadron RAuxAF Regiment, at RAF Leeming
No. 1 (Tactical) Police Squadron RAF, at RAF Honington
No. 3 Force Protection Wing, at RAF Marham
No. 3 (RAuxAF) Police Squadron, at RAF Honington
No. 6 RAF Police Squadron, at RAF Marham
No. 15 Squadron RAF Regiment, at RAF Marham
No. 2620 (County of Norfolk) Squadron RAuxAF Regiment, at RAF Marham
No. 4 Force Protection Wing, at RAF Brize Norton
No. 2 Squadron RAF Regiment, at RAF Brize Norton
No. 7 RAF Police Squadron, at RAF Brize Norton
No. 2624 (County of Oxfordshire) Squadron RAuxAF Regiment, at RAF Brize Norton
No. 5 Force Protection Wing, at RAF Lossiemouth
No. 4 RAF Police Squadron, at RAF Lossiemouth
No. 51 Squadron RAF Regiment, at RAF Lossiemouth
No. 603 (City of Edinburgh) Squadron RAuxAF (Mixed Police/Regiment role), at Edinburgh
No. 2622 (Highland) Squadron RAuxAF Regiment, at RAF Lossieouth
No. 7 Force Protection Wing, at RAF Coningsby
No. 63 (Queen's Colour) Squadron RAF Regiment, at RAF Northolt
No. 2623 (East Anglian) Squadron RAuxAF Regiment, at RAF Honington
Air Land Integration Cell, at RAF Coningsby
No. 8 Force Protection Wing, at RAF Waddington
No. 1 Squadron RAF Regiment, at RAF Honington
No. 5 RAF Police Squadron, at RAF Waddington
No. 2503 (County of Lincoln) Squadron RAuxAF Regiment, at RAF Waddington

UK Air Surveillance And Control System
UK Air Surveillance And Control System
RRH Benbecula
RRH Brizlee Wood
RRH Buchan
RRH Neatishead
RRH Portreath
RRH Saxa Vord
RRH Staxton Wold
RRH Trimingham

No. 11 Group
No. 11 Group is the newest group formed in the RAF, having only been reformed in late 2018 as a "multi-domain operations group." Air Vice-Marshal Philip Robinson has been the AOC, since December 2021.

Headquarters, No. 11 Group, at RAF High Wycombe
Joint Force Air Component Headquarters, at RAF High Wycombe
National Air & Space Operations Centre, at RAF High Wycombe
RAF Spadeadam
Electronic Warfare Tactics Range

No. 22 Group
No. 22 Group is the direct successor to the Training Group, and so is responsible for RAF training policy and training establishments. It has been commanded by Air Vice Marshal Richard Maddison since August 2020.

The group commands the following stations:
RAF Cosford
RAF Halton
RAF Cranwell
RAF Linton-on-Ouse
RAF Shawbury
RAF St Mawgan
RAF Valley
RAF Woodvale
MoD St Athan
Headquarters, No. 22 Group, at RAF High Wycombe
Directorate of Ground Training
RAF Central Training School, at RAF Halton
Recruit Training Squadron
Airmens Command Squadron
Specialist Training Squadron
International Defence Training (RAF), at RAF Halton
Defence Survive, Evade, Resist, Extract Training Organisation
Defence College of Air and Space Operations, at RAF Shawbury
School of Air Operations Control
School of Aerospace Battle Management
Directorate of Flying Training
Headquarters Central Flying School, at RAF Cranwell
No. 1 Flying Training School RAF (Tri-Service), at RAF Shawbury
No. 660 Squadron, Army Air Corps, at RAF Shawbury, (Airbus Juno HT1)
705 Naval Air Squadron, at RAF Shawbury, (Airbus Juno HT1)
No. 202 Squadron RAF, at RAF Valley, (Airbus Jupiter HT1)
9th Regiment Army Air Corps (British Army)
No. 60 Squadron RAF, at RAF Shawbury, (Airbus Juno HT1)
No. 670 Squadron, Army Air Corps, at RAF Shawbury, (Airbus Juno HT1)
No. 3 Flying Training School RAF (Tri-Service), at RAF Cranwell
No. 16 Squadron RAF, at RAF Wittering, (Grob Tutor T1)
No. 45 Squadron RAF, at RAF Cranwell, (Embraer Phenom T1)
No. 57 Squadron RAF, at RAF Cranwell, (Grob Prefect T1)
No. 674 Squadron, Army Air Corps, (Grob Prefect T1), at RAF Barkston Heath
703 Naval Air Squadron, at RAF Barkston Heath, (Grob Prefect T1)
No. 4 Flying Training School RAF, at RAF Valley
No. 4 Squadron RAF, at RAF Valley, (Hawk T2)
No. 25 Squadron RAF, at RAF Valley, (Hawk T2)
No. 72 Squadron RAF, at RAF Valley, (Texan T1)
Central Flying School Advanced Training Unit
No. 6 Flying Training School RAF, at RAF Cranwell
No. 115 Squadron RAF, at RAF Wittering, (Grob Tutor T1)
University Air Squadrons
University of Birmingham Air Squadron, at RAF Cosford, (Grob Tutor T1)
Bristol University Air Squadron, at Colerne Airfield, (Grob Tutor T1)
Cambridge University Air Squadron, at RAF Wittering, (Grob Tutor T1)
East Midlands Universities Air Squadron, at RAF Cranwell, (Grob Tutor T1)
East of Scotland Universities Air Squadron, at Leuchars Station, (Grob Tutor T1)
Universities of Glasgow and Strathclyde Air Squadron, at Glasgow Airport, (Grob Tutor T1)
Liverpool University Air Squadron, at RAF Woodvale, (Grob Tutor T1)
University of London Air Squadron, at RAF Wittering, (Grob Tutor T1)
Manchester and Salford Universities Air Squadron, at RAF Woodvale, (Grob Tutor T1)
Northern Ireland Universities Air Squadron, at JHFS Aldergrove, (Grob Tutor T1)
Northumbrian Universities Air Squadron, at RAF Leeming, (Grob Tutor T1)
Oxford University Air Squadron, at RAF Benson, (Grob Tutor T1)
Southampton University Air Squadron, at MoD Boscombe Down, (Grob Tutor T1)
University of Wales Air Squadron, at MoD St Athan, (Grob Tutor T1)
Yorkshire Universities Air Squadron, at RAF Linton-on-Ouse, (Grob Tutor T1)
Air Experience Flights
No. 1 Air Experience Flight RAF, at MoD St Athan, (Grob Tutor T1)
No. 2 Air Experience Flight RAF, at MoD Boscombe Down, (Grob Tutor T1)
No. 3 Air Experience Flight RAF, at Colerne Airfield, (Grob Tutor T1)
No. 4 Air Experience Flight RAF, at Glasgow Airport, (Grob Tutor T1)
No. 5 Air Experience Flight RAF, at RAF Wittering, (Grob Tutor T1)
No. 6 Air Experience Flight RAF, at RAF Benson, (Grob Tutor T1)
No. 7 Air Experience Flight RAF, at RAF Cranwell, (Grob Tutor T1)
No. 8 Air Experience Flight RAF, at RAF Cosford, (Grob Tutor T1)
No. 9 Air Experience Flight RAF, at RAF Linton-on-Ouse, (Grob Tutor T1)
No. 10 Air Experience Flight RAF, at RAF Woodvale, (Grob Tutor T1)
No. 11 Air Experience Flight RAF, at RAF Leeming, (Grob Tutor T1)
No. 12 Air Experience Flight RAF, at RAF Leuchars, (Grob Tutor T1)
No. 13 Air Experience Flight RAF, at JHFS Aldergrove, (Grob Tutor T1)
Defence College of Technical Training, at MoD Lyneham
Defence School of Aeronautical Engineering, at RAF Cosford
RAF Aerosystems Engineer and Management Training School
School of Army Aeronautical Engineering, at MoD Lyneham
No. 1 School of Technical Training RAF, at RAF Cosford
No. 238 Squadron RAF
Aerosystems Training Squadron
Mechanical Training Squadron
Trenchard Squadron
Royal Navy Air Engineering and Survival School, at 
764 Initial Training Squadron
Advanced Training Group
Common Training Group
Specialist Training Group
Training Support Group
Defence School of Communications and Information Systems, at Blandford Camp
No. 1 Radio School RAF, at RAF Cosford
The Aerial Erector School, at RAF Digby
Training Delivery Squadron
Training Management Support Squadron
Academic Accreditation Group
Royal School of Signals, at Blandford Camp
11th (Royal Corps of Signals) Signal Regiment, Royal Corps of Signals, at Blandford Camp
2 (Catterick) Squadron
3 (Harrogate) Squadron
4 (Military Training) Squadron
5 (Maresfield) Squadron
Defence School of Electro-Mechanical Engineering, at MoD Lyneham
No. 4 School of Technical Training RAF, at MoD St Athan
8 Training Battalion, Royal Electrical and Mechanical Engineers, at MoD Lyneham
Royal Electrical and Mechanical Engineers Arms School, at MoD Lyneham
Defence School of Marine Engineering, at HMS Sultan''
Marine Engineering Department
Craft Skills Group
Training Support Organisation
Directorate of RAF Sport
RAF School of Physical Training, at RAF Cosford
RAF Sports Board, at RAF Halton
Royal Air Force College Cranwell
Officer and Aircrew Cadet Training Unit Cranwell intakes usually take place at ten week intervals throughout the year.
Headquarters, Royal Air Force Air Cadets, at RAF Cranwell
No. 2 Flying Training School RAF, at RAF Syerston
Central Gliding School, at RAF Syerston
No. 614 Volunteer Gliding Squadron RAF, at MDP Wethersfield, (Grob Viking T1)
No. 615 Volunteer Gliding Squadron RAF, at Kenley Airfield, (Grob Viking T1)
No. 621 Volunteer Gliding Squadron RAF, at RAF Little Rissington, (Grob Viking T1)
No. 622 Volunteer Gliding Squadron RAF, at Trenchard Lines, (Grob Viking T1)
No. 626 Volunteer Gliding Squadron RAF, at Predannack Airfield, (Grob Viking T1)
No. 632 Volunteer Gliding Squadron RAF, at Tern Hill Airfield, (Grob Viking T1)
No. 637 Volunteer Gliding Squadron RAF, at RAF Little Rissington, (Grob Viking T1)
No. 644 Volunteer Gliding Squadron RAF, at RAF Syerston, (Grob Viking T1)
No. 645 Volunteer Gliding Squadron RAF, at RAF Topcliffe , (Grob Viking T1)
No. 661 Volunteer Gliding Squadron RAF, at RAF Kirknewton, (Grob Viking T1)

No. 83 Expeditionary Air Group
No. 83 Expeditionary Air Group is the collation of all of the RAF's assets that support operations in the Middle East, i.e., Op Kipion, and Op Shader. The Group has been commanded by Air Commodore Simon Strasdin since September 2020.

Headquarters, No. 83 Expeditionary Air Group, at RAF Al Udeid, Qatar
No. 901 Expeditionary Air Wing, at RAF Al Udeid
Joint Force Communication Information Systems
Joint Force Support (Middle East) Force Movements Control Centre
Combined Air Operations Centre
No. 902 Expeditionary Air Wing, at RAFO Musannah
No. No. 903 Expeditionary Air Wing, at RAF Akrotiri
No. 906 Expeditionary Air Wing, at Al Minhad Air Base

References

Structure of contemporary air forces
Military units and formations of the Royal Air Force
Royal Air Force